A Qayyum (pronounced Qayyoom,) is a special spiritual position in Sufism, especially in the Naqshbandi tradition. The term was first coined by Ahmed Sirhindi, who was the first qayyum. According to him, a qayyum is a dignitary upon whom the whole order of existence depends. The word is derived from Al-Qayyum, a name of God in Islam that has the same meaning. According to the doctrine, only one qayyum is alive at any particular time.

The first four qayyums
The first qayyum was Ahmed Sirhindi (d. 1624). The second was Ahmed Sirhindi third son, Khwaja Muhammad Masum Faruqi (d.1668), who was followed by his son Khwaja Muhammad Hujjatullah Naqshband (d. 1703). The fourth qayyum was Khwaja Muhammad Zubair (d. 1740), the grandson of Khwaja Naqshband.

Other claimed Qayyums
Several other influential Sufis have claimed the title of qayyum.

Mirza Mazhar Jan-e-Janan Shaheed

Mirza Mazhar Jan-e-Janan (d. 1817) was an important saint of the Naqshbandi Sufi order in the 18th century. He was also a renowned poet of modern Urdu. Shah Waliullah, an Islamic scholar contemporary with Mirza Mazhar, is quoted as saying, "As far as I can see, and I can see the seven continents, there is no saint today like Mirza Mazhar."

Shah Muhammad Safiullah Faruqi (d.1844)
Muhammad Safiullah Faruqi was the son of Ghulam Masoom Faruqi Mujaddidi. He died in the Hijri month of Dhu al-Qadah in 1844 on his return journey from the hajj. Makhdoom Safi Ullah died in Hudaydah, a coastal city of Yemen.

Shah Ghulam Ali Dehlavi

Ghulam Ali Dehlavi (d. 1662) is also claimed to be the mujaddid, a person supposed to restore Islam every century, for the 13th century of the Islamic calendar.

Shah Abu Saeed Faruqi Mujaddidi
Abu Saeed Faruqi Mujaddidi (d.1672) was predicted to be the next qayyum by Ghulam Ali Dehlavi, his own shaykh.

Ahmed Miya Sarkar Naqshbandi Mujadidi Ganj Muradabadi

Ahmed Miya Sarkar Ganj Muradabadi was the Qayyum of his time, he is the eldest son and Janasheen of Gaus-E-Zaman, Owais-E-Dauran Maulana Shah Fazle Rehma Ganj Muradabadi one of the greatest master of Naqshbandi golden chain.

Muhammad Masoom Qayyum e panjim
Qutb e Zaman, Mujaddid e Doran, Mujahid e millat, Alim e Muballigh e Islam Khawaja e Khawajgan Muhammad Masoom (1993.d) was the fifth Qayyum of his time۔ He Was the Youngest son of Mahbob e Subhani, Qutb e Rabbani, Shahbaz e La-makani, Sultan ul oliya Zari Zara Bakht Sufi Nawab uddin. He was the greatest master of Naqshbandi Mujaddidi Golden chain. Muhammad Masoom was predicted to be a qayyum by Sufi Nawab ud din, his own shaykh. When Muhammad Massoom was born Mian MuhammadBaksh Sharakpori Sarkar Rehmatulla Alahi predicted that when I will be leaving this world then Last Qayoom will be appear to be born from Mohari Sharif the village of Kharriyan Cantt City.

Qayyum today
After The Death of Qayyum.e.Punjum Alhaj khwaja Muhammad Masoom No Qayyum present in Naqshbandi sufism. Until Qayyum VI comes, the Qayyum of Alhaj khwaja Muhammad Masoom will remain.

References

Sufism